Alauddin  Al-Azad (6 May 1932 – 3 July 2009) was a modern Bangladeshi author, novelist, and poet.

Early life and education

Azad was born in Dhaka. He Passed Secondary School Certificate and Higher Secondary School Certificate in 1947 and 1949 respectively. From Dhaka University he earned his BA (Honors) and MA in 1953 and 1954. He received his PhD from London University in 1970 for his work Iswar Gupter Jeebon o Kabita. Also he was a first secretary of Bangladesh High Commission in Moscow. He died on 3 July 2009, in Uttara Thana.

Works
His literary works were included in the curriculum of school level, secondary, higher secondary and graduation level Bengali Literature in Bangladesh.

Novels
Teish Nambor Toilochitra (Oil Painting Number Twenty Three, 1960)
Shiter Sheshrat Basanter Pratham Din  (Last Night of Winter First Day of Spring, 1962)
Karnafuli (Karnafuli river 1962)
Khuda O Asha (Hunger and Hope, 1964)
Khashra Kagoj (Papers for Rough Sketch,  1986)
Shyam  Chhayar Songbad  (Intimations of Green Shadows,  1986); 
Jyotsnar Ajana Jiban (Unknown Life of Jyotsna, 1986)
Jekhane Danriye Achi (The  Spot I Stand on, 1986)
Swagatam  Bhalobasha (Welcome,  Love, 1990)
Apar Joddhara (Other  Soldiers, 1992)
Purana Polton (1992)
Antarikshe  Briksharaji (Trees in the Sky,  1992)
Priya Prince (Dear Prince, 1995)
Campus (1994)
Anudita Andhokar (Translated Darkness, 1991)
Swapnoshila (Dreamstone, 1992)
Kalo Jyotsnay Candramallika (Candramallika in Dark Moonlight, 1996)
Bishrinkhala (Chaos, 1997)
Nirbachito Bangla Choty Golpo

Stories
Jege Achi
Dhankannya
Mrigonavi
Andhokar Shiri
Ujan Taronge
Jakhan Saykat
Amar Rokto swapno amar
জীবনজমিন

Poems
Manchitra
Vorer Nodir Mohonay Jagoron
Surjo Jalar Swapan
jouno golpo somogro
লেলিহান  পান্ডুলিপি
নিখোঁজ সনেটগুচ্ছ
সাজঘর

Drama
Ehuder Meye
Morokkor Jadukar
Dhanyabad
Mayabi Prohor
Songbad Sesangsho

Essays
Shilper Sadhona
Sahittyer Sguntok Ritu

Book on Liberation War
Ferrari Diary [1978]

Awards
Bangla Academy Literary Award (1965)
UNESCO Award (1965)
National Film Award (1977)
Sight  and Film Award (1977)
Abul Kalam Shamsuddin Literary Award (1983)
Abul Mansur Ahmad Literary Award (1984)
Lekhika Sangha Award (1985)
Rangdhanu Award (1985)
Alakta Literary Award (1986)
Ekushey Padak (1986)
Sher-e-Bangla Literary Award (1987)
Natyasava Baktitya Award (1989)
Kathak Academy  Award, (1989)
Kalacakra Medal (1988–89)
Lok Forum Gold  Medal (1990)
Deshbandhu Chittaranjan Das Gold Medal (1994)

References

External links

Golpo Songroho (Collected Stories), the national textbook of B.A. (pass and subsidiary) course of Bangladesh, published by University of Dhaka in 1979 (reprint in 1986).
Bangla Sahitya (Bengali Literature), the national textbook of intermediate (college) level of Bangladesh published in 1996 by all educational boards.

Bengali male poets
Bengali-language writers
Recipients of the Ekushey Padak
Bangladeshi male poets
Bengali-language poets
1932 births
2009 deaths
Recipients of Bangla Academy Award
20th-century Bangladeshi poets
20th-century Bangladeshi male writers
Best Story National Film Award (Bangladesh) winners
20th-century screenwriters